Shawkat Jamil is a Bangladeshi film director. He is the former president of the Bangladesh Film Directors Association.

Biography
Jamil directed films like Shesh Roksha, Chalbaz, Sobar Upore and Ekjon Shonge Chilo. These films are selected for preservation in Bangladesh Film Archive. Jekhane Tumi Sekhane Ami was his last direction. It was released in 2010.

Selected filmography
 Premer Baji
 Shesh Roksha 
 Dorodi Sotan 
 Chalbaz
 Sobar Upore
 Ekjon Shonge Chilo
 Jekhane Tumi Sekhane Ami

References

Living people
People from Kushtia District
Bangladeshi film directors
Year of birth missing (living people)